Theodore Roosevelt O'Neil Meighen (October 1905 – 1979) was a Canadian lawyer and philanthropist. He was the eldest son of former Prime Minister Arthur Meighen and Isabel Cox.

Education
Meighen was born in Portage la Prairie, Manitoba. He attended the Royal Military College of Canada in Kingston, Ontario in 1925, student #1865. He studied law at Université Laval in Quebec City.

Career
He practiced law in Montreal, and became a senior partner in the firm of McMaster Meighen. During World War II, he was based in Halifax, Nova Scotia while serving in the Royal Canadian Artillery. After the war he retired, with the rank of lieutenant colonel.

He established the T. R. Meighen Family Foundation in 1969.

Family
Meighen married Margaret "Peggy" DeLancey Robinson in 1937. She was a descendant of American Loyalist Beverley Robinson. Their children included Michael Meighen, who was later named to the Senate of Canada. Following Theodore Meighen's death, Peggy married Senator Hartland Molson in 1990, and remains the only Canadian ever to have both a son and a husband sitting in the Canadian Senate simultaneously. She died on December 18, 2000, at the age of 85, in Montreal, Quebec, Canada.

Theodore Meighen was also the brother of arts philanthropist Lillian Meighen Wright.

External links
 T. R. Meighen Family Foundation

References

Theodore Meighen
1905 births
1979 deaths
Canadian military personnel of World War II
Lawyers in Quebec
Canadian philanthropists
Children of prime ministers of Canada
People from Portage la Prairie
Royal Military College of Canada alumni
20th-century philanthropists
Canadian people of Scottish descent